Mirzamys is a genus of rodent in the family Muridae endemic to New Guinea.
It contains the following species:
 Mirza's western moss rat (Mirzamys louiseae)
 Mirza's eastern moss rat (Mirzamys norahae)

References

http://www.bioone.org/doi/abs/10.1206/582-8.1

 
Rodent genera
Endemic fauna of New Guinea